Frederick Valdemar Erastus Peterson (July 18, 1903 – October 17, 1983), also known as Val Peterson, was an American politician and diplomat who served as the 26th governor of Nebraska from 1947 to 1953, as director of the Federal Civil Defense Administration from 1953 to 1957, U.S. ambassador to Denmark from 1957 to 1961, and U.S. Ambassador to Finland from 1969 to 1973.

Early life and education
Peterson was born in Oakland, Nebraska the son of Henry C. Peterson and Hermanda (Swanberg) Peterson. He received his Bachelor of Arts degree from Wayne State Teachers College and a Master of Arts degree in political science from the University of Nebraska–Lincoln. Following 1933, Peterson maintained his permanent residence in Elgin, Nebraska.

Career
Peterson worked as a teacher, school administrator, and newspaper man. He was the Elgin superintendent of schools and was the publisher of The Elgin Review for ten years. During World War II he served as lieutenant colonel in the United States Army Air Forces.

Peterson first entered politics as the campaign manager for the Hugh Butler 1940 U.S. senatorial bid. He also was the administrative assistant and secretary to Governor Dwight Griswold from 1941 to 1942. Peterson next secured the Republican gubernatorial nomination, and was elected governor in November 1946. He was reelected to a second term in 1948, and to a third term in 1950.

During his tenure, the Missouri River basin development was endorsed and highway revenue initiatives were sought. Also during Peterson's term, he chaired the State Governors Conference and presided over the Council of State Governments in 1952. In December 1951, Governor Peterson appointed Fred Andrew Seaton to the U.S. Senate to fill the vacancy caused by the death of Kenneth S. Wherry.

Peterson served in the Dwight D. Eisenhower administration as director of the Federal Civil Defense Administration from 1953 to 1957. As Federal Civil Defense Administrator, Peterson is reputed to have speculated about the possibility of creating a cobalt doomsday bomb. Peterson served as U.S. ambassador to Denmark, from 1957–1961 and U.S. ambassador to Finland, from 1969 to 1973.

Death 
Peterson died October 17, 1983 in Fremont, Nebraska, reportedly of respiratory failure following a struggle with Alzheimer's disease. He is interred at Oakdale Cemetery, Oakdale, Nebraska.

Legacy
The Peterson Fine Arts building at his alma mater, Wayne State College, was named in his honor. A variety of autographed photographs representing his political career (particularly a full Eisenhower Cabinet photo with autographs of each member, as well as a personally inscribed color photograph of Richard Nixon) were on display for many years at the Wayne State library. However, the photos began to deteriorate due to exposure, and had to be removed; they are still in the possession of the college.

References

Further sources
 "Peterson, (Frederick) Val(demar Erastus)" in Current Biography 1949.

External links
United States Department of State: Ambassadors to Denmark
United States Department of State: Ambassadors to Finland
The Political Graveyard: Peterson, Frederick Valdemar Erastus
 
 

|-

|-

|-

|-

|-

1903 births
1983 deaths
20th-century American politicians
Ambassadors of the United States to Denmark
Ambassadors of the United States to Finland
American Lutherans
American people of Danish descent
United States Army Air Forces personnel of World War II
Danish-American culture in Nebraska
Eisenhower administration cabinet members
Republican Party governors of Nebraska
People from Oakland, Nebraska
United States Army Air Forces officers
University of Nebraska–Lincoln alumni
20th-century Lutherans
United States Army colonels